Árvore ("Tree") was a Portuguese literary magazine, published in Lisbon between 1951 and 1953, in a total of four issues.

An independent publication with a specialization in poetry, Árvore was mainly focused on discussion and criticism, as well as on the dissemination of the poetry of young poets, critical reviews of poetic works, and essays "in defense of Poetry".

Contributors
This magazine was directed and edited by António Luís Moita, António Ramos Rosa, José Terra, Luís Amaro and Raul de Carvalho.

Artistic collaborators included Cipriano Dourado, Lima de Freitas and Fernando Lanhas.

The magazine counted among its collaborators such writers as:  
 
 Egito Gonçalves
 Eugénio de Andrade
 Sophia de Mello Breyner Andresen
 Maria Cristina Araújo
 Matilde Rosa Araújo
 Humberto d'Ávila
 José Bento
 René Char
 Carlos Eurico da Costa
 Luísa Dacosta
 Paul Éluard
 Adriano Lourenço de Faria
 Rogério Fernandes
 Armando Ventura Ferreira
 Vergílio Ferreira
 Manuel da Fonseca
 José-Augusto França
 Natércia Freire
 Sebastião da Gama
 Oliveira Guimarães
 Alberto de Lacerda
 Jorge de Lima
 Eduardo Lourenço
 Alfredo Margarido
 Albano Dias Martins
 Henri Michaux
 David Mourão-Ferreira
 Mário Sacramento
 Álvaro Salema
 Jorge de Sena
 Mário Cesariny de Vasconcelos 
 Fernando Vieira

References

External links 
 Digital copy in the Lisbon Municipal Library
 Gonda, Cinda: "Árvore': short history of a review" (in Portuguese) [PDF]
 Martins, Albano: "Nos 50 Anos de Árvore: Folhas de Poesia" (in Portuguese) [PDF]
 Reynaud, Maria João: "Árvore: Um olhar transversal" (in Portuguese) [PDF]
 List of periodicals available at the Municipal Library of Lisbon in digital format

1951 establishments in Portugal
1953 disestablishments in Portugal
Defunct literary magazines published in Europe
Defunct magazines published in Portugal
Magazines established in 1951
Magazines disestablished in 1953
Magazines published in Lisbon
Independent magazines
Poetry literary magazines
Literary magazines published in Portugal
Portuguese-language magazines